John Paul Shasky (born July 31, 1964) is a retired American professional basketball player, a 6'11" (211 cm) and 235 lb (107 kg) center. Born in Birmingham, Michigan, he played collegiately at the University of Minnesota for four seasons (from 1982 to 1986).

Shasky was selected with the 14th pick of the third round (61st pick overall) in the 1986 NBA Draft by the Utah Jazz. He played in the NBA for 3 seasons for the Miami Heat (1988/89), Golden State Warriors (1989/90), and Dallas Mavericks (1990/91), averaging 3.8 points and 2.8 rebounds per game in 11.1 minutes per game on average.

External links
NBA stats @ basketballreference.com

1964 births
Living people
American expatriate basketball people in France
American expatriate basketball people in Greece
American expatriate basketball people in Italy
American expatriate basketball people in Spain
Apollon Patras B.C. players
Basket Brescia Leonessa players
Basketball players from Michigan
CB Valladolid players
Cholet Basket players
Centers (basketball)
Dallas Mavericks players
Golden State Warriors players
Iraklis Thessaloniki B.C. players
Joventut Badalona players
Liga ACB players
Minnesota Golden Gophers men's basketball players
Miami Heat players
Pallacanestro Trapani players
Papagou B.C. players
People from Birmingham, Michigan
Rapid City Thrillers players
Utah Jazz draft picks
American men's basketball players
CEP Lorient players